Dušan Majdán (born 8 September 1987) is a Slovak racewalker. He competed in the 50 kilometres walk event at the 2013 World Championships in Athletics. He also competed in the 50 kilometres walk event at the 2015 World Championships in Athletics in Beijing, China.

In 2018, he competed in the men's 50 kilometres walk at the 2018 European Athletics Championships held in Berlin, Germany. He finished in 15th place.

See also
 Slovakia at the 2015 World Championships in Athletics

References

External links 
 
 Dušan Majdán at the Slovenský Olympijský Výbor 
 

1987 births
Living people
Slovak male racewalkers
Place of birth missing (living people)
World Athletics Championships athletes for Slovakia
Athletes (track and field) at the 2016 Summer Olympics
Olympic athletes of Slovakia